A.S.D. Trastevere Calcio is an Italian football club based in Monteverde Vecchio, a rione of Rome. The club was founded in 2013 by the relocation of A.S.D. Maccarese Calcio, and again in 2014 by the relocation of A.P.D. Ciampino, despite a namesake A.S.D. Trastevere F.C. already played in 2012–13 Terza Categoria Rome season. As of 2022–23 season, Trastevere was playing in Serie D.

History

Predecessors

A.S.D. Trastevere F.C.
A.S.D. Trastevere F.C. was founded in 2012 as a homage of the historical team of the area, which the first club was founded in 1909. The area also consisted of Francesco Totti's youth club Santa Maria in Trastevere (SMIT, namesake of Santa Maria in Trastevere), which was folded circa 1987.

A.S.D. Trastevere F.C. finished as the 5th in 2012–13 Terza Categoria Rome Group C, the 10th or the lowest level of Italian football league pyramid.

A.S.D. Trastevere Calcio
A.S.D. Trastevere Calcio was founded in 2013 by using the sports title of A.S.D. Maccarese Calcio. Another namesake of Maccarese was founded in 2013 as Pol. Maccarese Giada. In the first season, Trastevere finished as the 8th of 2013–14 Promozione Lazio Group C.

In 2014, the club buying the promotion again, which saw the relocation of A.P.D. Ciampino from Ciampino to Trastevere, as well as the renaming of the year 2013 Trastevere as A.S.D. Guardia di Finanza Calcio, a namesake of Guardia di Finanza. That club became A.S. Grifone Gialloverde in 2016. Ciampino also headquartered another team, Pol. Città di Ciampino.

Trastevere won 2014–15 Eccellenza Lazio season and promoted to 2015–16 Serie D.

The club finished as the runner-up of 2020–21 Serie D Group E.

See also
 Cisco Roma: another Rome based team that had reached Serie C

References

External links
  

Football clubs in Rome
Association football clubs established in 2012
2012 establishments in Italy
Phoenix clubs (association football)
Sports team relocations
Football clubs in Italy